The Babys are a British rock group best known for their songs "Isn't It Time" and "Every Time I Think of You". Both songs were composed by Jack Conrad and Ray Kennedy, and each reached No. 13 on the U.S. Billboard Hot 100 and No. 8 on the Cashbox chart in the late 1970s. The original Babys line-up consisted of founding member keyboardist/guitarist Michael Corby, and, in order of joining the group, vocalist/bassist John Waite, drummer Tony Brock, and guitarist Wally Stocker.

The group signed a contract with Chrysalis Records that was the highest ever for a new music act at the time. Two studio albums, The Babys and Broken Heart, were well received. After recording their third album, Head First, in August 1978, co-founder Michael Corby was replaced by Jonathan Cain as keyboardist and Ricky Phillips took over as bassist. From late 1978 until the breakup in 1981, The Babys line-up consisted of vocalist Waite, drummer Brock, bassist Phillips, guitarist Stocker, and keyboardist Cain.

Origin and name
Founding member Mike Corby places the origin of the idea for the band at Smalls Café on the Fulham Road in London in 1973, during a chance meeting with Adrian Millar. An agreement was signed between Corby and Millar on 4 September 1974, and auditions were held to fill out the remaining members.

Tony Brock was an established rock drummer, having played with Strider and Spontaneous Combustion. Financial difficulties with Strider, and the opportunity to join a group with sound financial backing, made him decide to take a chance with this group instead. The last member to join the line-up was Wally Stocker. In 1977, the band purchased a 24 track mobile unit with which to record their music. They went to a ranch house in the Malibu mountains and laid down the tracks in six weeks. However, the record sleeve says it was recorded at the famous Sound City in Southern California. The influences of the songs came about from their first year in Los Angeles and the culture shock of their relocation there.

Adrian Millar's girlfriend suggested The Babys and the unusual spelling stuck, Corby liked it because "it would piss mindless critics off."

Another version surfaced in a 1979 Hit Parader interview where Waite claimed

"The name was meant to be a joke. We took the name simply because the record companies wouldn't listen to any bands they thought were rock & roll. I mean, they wanted sure-fire teen bands, pre-teen bands. We couldn't get anybody down to hear us to get a record deal, so we called ourselves The Babys. We thought we'd keep the name just for two weeks. Then, the word got around in London that there was a band playing rock & roll called The Babys and it seemed so off the wall, so completely crazy, that it was worth taking a shot with. It really appealed to everyone's sense of humour."

Music videos were produced by Mike Mansfield for Supersonic, and Chrysalis Records signed the band in 1976.

Career
The Babys eponymous first album (highlighted by the single "If You've Got the Time"), was recorded in Toronto, Ontario, Canada, with producers Brian Christian and Bob Ezrin and released in January 1977, although it appears that Millar and Corby were unhappy with the production.

Their second album, Broken Heart, (released in September 1977) featured production by Ron Nevison and resulted in gaining the group a Top 20 U.S. hit, "Isn't It Time" (written by Jack Conrad and Ray Kennedy), that peaked at No. 13 on the Billboard chart. The song was a departure from the group's desire to only play their own material. Other writers' material, such as Mike Japp and Chas Sandford's "A Piece of the Action" was included. The album featured unique acoustic openings on "I'm Falling" and "Wrong or Right". Nevison's production techniques enhanced Waite's emerging talent as a vocalist and highlighted Brock's drumming, Stocker's guitar work, and Corby's instrumental abilities.

The band continued to tour the U.S. successfully with The Babettes, which included singers from Andrae Crouch and the Disciples: Lisa Freeman Roberts, Myrna Matthews and Pat Henderson. The album spent two weeks at #1 in Australia and produced a #1 single with "Isn't It Time". Disputes with Chrysalis management resulted in the firing of original manager Millar in 1978. Corby exited shortly thereafter. Equipment Manager Ray Sheriff states:
"Almost immediately after Michael's leaving, the remainder of the band went into auditions for a replacement. Jonathan Cain, in fact, became Mike’s successor, but I am sure he had not been selected until after Mike left. The other musician was Ricky Phillips, who played bass. I think from what John, Wally and Tony said that it was they, and not Chrysalis, who selected these two successors, and I think that at about this same time Lookout Management ceased to be the band’s managers."

Two American musicians became a part of the lineup following the release of the third album, Head First. Keyboardist/guitarist/vocalist Jonathan Cain replaced Corby, and bassist Ricky Phillips (of Nasty Habit) joined in the late fall of 1978, making it a five-piece band. The new quintet made their debut at the Whisky a Go Go on 31 December 1978. The band's fourth album, Union Jacks, (released in January 1980), produced by Keith Olsen, had a more punchy sound; the single, "Back on My Feet Again," spent a short time in the Top 40. Anne Marie Leclerc, who guested on Union Jacks, appeared as a backup singer on tour with the band in 1979–1980. During an extensive tour in 1980, The Babys opened for Journey, the band that Jonathan Cain would soon join. The band's fifth album, On the Edge, was made during the 1980 tour, and released in October 1980. The single, "Turn and Walk Away", reached the Top 100.

During a performance in Cincinnati on 9 December 1980 (the day after John Lennon had been murdered), John Waite was pulled from the stage by an overzealous fan during an encore and seriously injured his knee. Following a subsequent final performance by the group in Akron, Ohio, the remainder of the tour was cancelled, and the group disbanded following the tour. Although different members of the group have given various reasons for the band's demise, the general issue seems to have been disillusionment that the group never really achieved the success they felt they deserved given the quality of their albums and live shows.

Within four years of leaving the band, John Waite had a U.S. Number One hit with Chas Sandford and Mark Leonard's "Missing You" in 1984 from his second solo album No Brakes. Stocker and Brock worked with Rod Stewart and other mainstream artists including Elton John and Air Supply. Cain joined Journey, becoming one of its primary songwriters. Waite, Cain and Phillips formed Bad English in the late 1980s. Phillips currently plays for Styx.

Aftermath
Jonathan Cain joined Journey just as that band was on the verge of mainstream success. John Waite embarked on a successful solo career, peaking with a number one American hit in 1984 with "Missing You." Waite and Cain would reunite with Ricky Phillips at the end of the 1980s to form the hard rock/glam rock-infused supergroup Bad English, scoring several hits from their 1989 self-titled album. Tony Brock spent many years drumming for Rod Stewart, as well as drumming and co-producing for Jimmy Barnes and producing for Keith Urban. Wally Stocker went on to join Brock in Rod Stewart's band and briefly joined Air Supply in the mid-1980s, later playing in a reformed version of Humble Pie in the 1990s.

Adrian Millar died on 10 December 2006 at the age of 58.

Reforming The Babys
In 2013 The Babys reformed with originals Tony Brock and Wally Stocker, and two new members - American John Bisaha (The Nameless, Azure Blue, Hall of Souls, BISAHA) on vocals and bass, along with American guitarist Joey Sykes (Boystown, Coward, Meredith Brooks), who replaced J. P. Cervoni after his brief tenure. The new look Babys debuted in the summer of 2013 at The Canyon Club in Agoura Hills, California. In June 2014, their latest album, I'll Have Some of That!, was released.

Live, the band currently features a keyboardist (at time of writing Walter Ino is playing) and 'The Babettes' - Holly Bisaha and Elisa Chadbourne.

Discography

Albums

Singles

Band members
 John Bisaha - bass guitar, lead vocals 
 Wally Stocker - lead guitar 
 Joey Sykes - rhythm guitar, backing vocals 
 Tony Brock - drums, occasional piano , backing vocals

Touring members 
 Francesco Saglietti - keyboards 
 Eric Ragno - keyboards 
 Brian Johnson - keyboards 
 Louis Middleton - keyboards 
 Walter Ino - keyboards 
 Holly Bisaha - backing vocals 
 Elisa Chadbourne - backing vocals

Former members
 John Waite - bass guitar , lead vocals 
 Michael Corby - keyboards, rhythm guitar 
 Jonathan Cain - keyboards, backing vocals , rhythm guitar 
 Jimmy Bain - bass guitar 
 Ricky Phillips - bass guitar 
 J. P. Cervoni - rhythm guitar, backing vocals

Timeline

References

External links
 
 

1975 establishments in England
Chrysalis Records artists
English power pop groups
English hard rock musical groups
Musical groups established in 1975
Musical groups disestablished in 1981
Musical groups reestablished in 2013